Chloroclystis leucopygata is a moth in the family Geometridae. It is found in Sulawesi as well as in India.

The forewings are red-brown, suffused in parts with fuscous. The hindwings are similar to the forewings, but the submarginal line is whiter.

Subspecies
Chloroclystis leucopygata leucopygata (India)
Chloroclystis leucopygata cata Prout, 1958 (Sulawesi)

References

External links

Moths described in 1896
leucopygata
Moths of Asia
Moths of Indonesia